Paphiopedilum henryanum is a species of orchid ranging from southeastern Yunnan and Guangxi to northern Vietnam. It is named for orchid hunter Henry Azadehdel.

References

henryanum